McLin is a surname. Notable people with the surname include:

Benjamin E. McLin (1851–1912), American lawyer, businessman and politician
C. J. McLin (1921–1988), American politician
Claude McLin (1925–1995), American jazz tenor saxophonist
Jimmy McLin (1908–1983), American jazz banjoist and guitarist
Lena McLin (born 1928), American composer and writer
Mac McLin (1899–1966), American civil rights activist and politician
Rhine McLin (born 1948), American politician
Stephen McLin (born 1946), American banking executive and philanthropist

See also
McLin Glacier, a glacier of Antarctica